Pruss is a German language habitational surname for someone from Prussia. Notable people with the name include:
 Alexander Pruss (1973), Canadian philosopher, mathematician
 Max Pruss (1891–1960), commanding captain of the zeppelin LZ 129 Hindenburg

See also 
 Preiss 
 Preuss

References 

German-language surnames
German toponymic surnames
Ethnonymic surnames